David Oaks (born May 12, 1972) is an American former sprinter.

References

1972 births
Living people
American male sprinters
Universiade medalists in athletics (track and field)
Place of birth missing (living people)
Barton Cougars men's track and field athletes
Track and field athletes from Oklahoma
Universiade gold medalists for the United States
Medalists at the 1993 Summer Universiade
Medalists at the 1995 Summer Universiade